Interstate 75 (I-75) is a part of the Interstate Highway System that runs from the Hialeah–Miami Lakes border, a few miles northwest of Miami, to Sault Ste. Marie in the Upper Peninsula of Michigan. I-75 begins its national northward journey near Miami, running along the western parts of the Miami metropolitan area before traveling westward across Alligator Alley (also known as Everglades Parkway), resuming its northward direction in Naples, running along Florida's Gulf Coast, and passing the cities of Fort Myers, Punta Gorda, Venice, and Sarasota. The freeway passes through the Tampa Bay area before turning inward toward Ocala, Gainesville, and Lake City before leaving the state and entering Georgia.

The portion of I-75 from Tampa northward was a part of the original 1955 Interstate Highway plans, with I-75's southern terminus at I-4's current western terminus. Planning to extend the Interstate south to Miami began in 1968 after massive growth in Southwest Florida, which resulted in I-75 being realigned to travel on the eastern fringes of the Tampa Bay area, and the last portion of the highway was opened in 1993.

For Florida Department of Transportation (FDOT) inventory purposes, it is designated as State Road 93 (SR 93) for most of its length in Florida (with exception to the Tampa Bay area, where SR 93 follows I-275, while SR 93A travels with I-75 in the latter's bypass of the area).

Route description

South Florida
I-75 begins its northward journey at an interchange with SR 826 (Palmetto Expressway) and SR 924 (Gratigny Parkway) on the Hialeah–Miami Lakes border, near Miami.

As it curves around the border of Miami Lakes, I-75 serves some of the western fringes of South Florida as an eight-lane highway. After an exit with SR 860, I-75 has an interchange with the Homestead Extension of Florida's Turnpike before crossing into Broward County. There, it continues through the western suburbs of Pembroke Pines, Weston, Miramar, Davie, and Southwest Ranches.

At the junction of SR 869 (Sawgrass Expressway) and I-595, I-75 (while maintaining its south–north status) enters a west–east trajectory as it crosses the Everglades by way of Alligator Alley, a toll road that runs from the Collier Boulevard (exit 101) toll plaza to the U.S. Highway 27 (US 27) toll plaza (exit 23). It was originally constructed as a two-lane highway before it was converted to a four-lane highway meeting Interstate Highway standards. At this point, I-75 loses a lane in each direction, heading west, losing another lane west of the US 27 interchange.

The Everglades and Southwest Florida

The Alligator Alley section of I-75 runs due east–west between exit 19 in Sunrise and exit 101 just east of Naples and is one of only two sections along the Interstate's entirety that is tolled (the other is the Mackinac Bridge in northern Michigan). Tolls are $3.25 for a two-axle vehicle as of March 1, 2020, and are collected in both directions. The highway's toll plazas accept both cash and transponders in the SunPass network and are located at either entrance to Alligator Alley. All toll facilities along Alligator Alley and toll revenue collected from them are overseen by the Florida's Turnpike Enterprise (FTE), a government agency which is part of FDOT. There are a mere two interchanges along the  tolled portion of Alligator Alley in addition to three rest areas and a number of scenic outlook points as the highway crosses the Everglades.  I-75 enters Collier County along Alligator Alley just west of the Snake Road exit (exit 49) and passes through the Big Cypress National Preserve between the Collier County border and SR 29 (exit 80). There are a number of small bridges along Alligator Alley which allow wildlife to pass safely under the freeway, especially along the Florida Panther National Wildlife Refuge east of SR 29. Extensive fencing also prevents wildlife from interfering with traffic.

As it approaches Naples at County Road 951 (exit 101), I-75 makes a sharp turn north resuming its south–north trajectory and as it parallels Florida's west coast, it becomes six lanes hereafter to the Georgia state line. At this point, Alligator Alley ends and I-75 is toll free for the rest of its length in Florida. As it continues north, I-75 passes near Bonita Springs, Fort Myers, Punta Gorda, Port Charlotte, Venice, Sarasota, and Bradenton before reaching the Tampa Bay area metropolis consisting of Tampa and St. Petersburg.

Tampa Bay area

North of Ellenton, I-275 splits from I-75 to serve St. Petersburg and Pinellas County via the Sunshine Skyway Bridge and Tampa via the Howard Frankland Bridge. I-75 parallels the eastern shore of Tampa Bay as a bypass route of the Tampa Bay area, as it passes by the communities of Brandon, Temple Terrace, and New Tampa. Two expressways access Downtown Tampa from I-75: the Lee Roy Selmon Expressway (SR 618) and I-4. Within the Tampa Bay metropolitan area, many interchanges are far more complex than mere diamond, cloverleaf, or even single-point urban interchanges. Aside from the large turbine interchange with I-4 (exit 261), there are interchanges with SR 582 (Fowler Avenue; exit 265) and SR 579 (Fletcher Avenue/Morris Bridge Road; exit 266) that contain both loops and flyovers. A flyover ramp was built from southbound SR 581 (Bruce B. Downs Boulevard; exit 270) to southbound I-75.

Northern Florida

At the Hillsborough–Pasco county line (south of SR 56 (exit 275)), I-275 rejoins I-75 (at exit 274, southbound only) and I-75 changes into a southwest–northeast trajectory as it passes through Pasco, Hernando, and Sumter counties where it runs through parts of the Withlacoochee State Forest on its way to the junction with Florida's Turnpike (exit 328, accessible from southbound I-75 only (although northbound travelers can access the Turnpike from I-75's exit 329 and follow SR 44 to the Turnpike's exit 304)). Widened median segments exist in northern Pasco, Hernando, and Sumter counties north of County Road 476B (exit 309). Some of these median segments are actually considered part of the Withlacoochee State Forest itself. The Withlacoochee State Trail runs beneath I-75 between US 98/SR 50 (exit 301) and the Hernando–Sumter county line, where it also crosses over the Withlacoochee River. All of I-75 from the Georgia border to Tampa is three lanes in each direction, unless closed for construction. This is to accommodate for the immense number of tourists and vacationers that come to Florida.

After Florida's Turnpike, I-75 changes into a general southeast–northwest trajectory, which is sustained to the Georgia state line and beyond. I-75 passes beneath the Cross Florida Greenway, which contains a land bridge built across the highway in 2001 between exits 341 and 350, before entering the city of Ocala, and passing by the cities of Gainesville and Lake City and crosses I-10 at an interchange before entering the state of Georgia, near Valdosta.

I-75 runs closest to US 41 except between Tampa and High Springs. It runs closer to US 301 between Ellenton and Temple Terrace, and again from Dade City to Sparr. From Belleview to Lake City, it runs closest to US 441.

History

Original route to Tampa
Original plans for I-75 called for its southern terminus to be in Tampa, where it would terminate at I-4 (at the current interchange between I-4 and I-275, with I-4, which was completed in the Tampa Bay area by 1962, continuing west along what is now I-275 over the Howard Frankland Bridge into St. Petersburg). Plans for I-75 from Tampa to Sault Ste. Marie, Michigan, were authorized as part of the Federal-Aid Highway Act of 1956, signed into law by President Dwight D. Eisenhower, which created the Interstate Highway System.

Construction of the original route from the Georgia border to Tampa via Gainesville and Ocala lasted through most of the 1960s. The first segment of I-75 to open in Florida was from the Georgia border to SR 6 just south of Jennings, which opened in 1963. It would reach US 90 in Lake City later that year. By mid-1964, I-75 opened from Lake City to the newly completed Florida's Turnpike (known then as the Sunshine State Parkway) in Wildwood. Segments of the original route that are now part of I-275 near Tampa would begin opening in 1966, and construction of the full route would be completed by 1969.

Extension to Miami
Due to major growth in Southwest Florida (particularly Fort Myers and Naples), it was becoming clear that this part of the state would soon need a freeway. Florida's state government first proposed to build a West Coast Turnpike in 1964 from the Tampa Bay area south to Naples. Plans for the West Coast Turnpike (which would have been tolled) were canceled in 1968, when it was announced that US Secretary of Transportation Alan S. Boyd had approved an extension of I-75 south to Naples and then east to Miami. The federal government would pay for 90 percent of the extension using funds allocated by the Federal-Aid Highway Act of 1968, which was signed into law by President Lyndon B. Johnson.

In preparation for the extension, I-75's designation was extended along the preexisting route of I-4 over the Howard Frankland Bridge into St. Petersburg by the end of 1969 (I-4's designation would be truncated to its current terminus at this time). From St. Petersburg, I-75 was proposed to continue south over the Sunshine Skyway Bridge and continue south along a new freeway roughly parallel to the Tamiami Trail (US 41) along the lower Gulf Coast to Naples.

As the extension was planned in 1968, plans were also made for a freeway bypassing Tampa Bay to the east. The bypass was initially planned to be designated Interstate 75E (I-75E), and was to split from I-75 near Wesley Chapel and rejoin it just north of Ellenton. However, in 1972, it was determined that maintaining the main route of I-75 through Downtown Tampa would eventually require major improvements to the existing infrastructure to handle through traffic. As a result, it was decided that I-75 would instead follow the bypass route. FDOT could have renumbered I-75E into what could have possibly been Interstate 75W (I-75W), but, due to a 1973-based American Association of State Highway and Transportation Officials (AASHTO) rule indicating that suffixed routes were to be renumbered to reduce motorist confusion, the option of renumbering I-75E into I-75W was scrapped. Instead, the I-75E designation was renumbered to what is known today as I-275, and both the I-75 and I-275 designations were swapped into their current configuration in 1973. I-75 reached as far south as 38th Avenue North in St. Petersburg when the designations were switched. Despite the designation switch, both freeways' hidden designations still reflect the originally planned routing, with I-75's SR 93 designation following I-275, and the current route of I-75 on the bypass being designated SR 93A. Construction on the bypass segment of I-75 began in 1979.

The initially favored proposal for I-75 to reach Miami from Naples was to have I-75 run along the Tamiami Trail (US 41) across the Everglades to just east of the SR 826 (Palmetto Expressway) where it would continue along SR 836 (Dolphin Expressway) and terminate at I-95 and I-395 in Downtown Miami.

Planners made the decision in 1973 to shift I-75's proposed route to cross the Everglades along Alligator Alley over environmental concerns related to upgrading the Tamiami Trail, which runs along the northern border of Everglades National Park. Additionally, Alligator Alley itself needed upgrading, as the then-narrow toll road was dangerous to both motorists and wildlife (most notably the Florida panther) alike, and they deemed the costs of upgrading the Dolphin Expressway to Interstate Highway standards to be highly expensive. By using this route, I-75 would run along the alley to the proposed Port Everglades Expressway, where it would turn south along a new freeway through the western suburbs of Weston and Pembroke Pines to Miami. It was still planned to continue east to I-95, but, due to local opposition, I-75 was not built past its current terminus at SR 826 (Palmetto Expressway) in Hialeah. With this new route, the Port Everglades Expressway was then planned to be built as an Interstate highway designated I-595 to provide an Interstate connection between I-75 and I-95.

The first piece of the south extension of I-75 to open was a short segment just east of Fort Myers from SR 78 south to Corkscrew Road in 1979. This piece would extend north to Tucker's Grade just south of Punta Gorda in early 1980 and south to Immokalee Road in North Naples by 1981. Also in 1981, the segment from US 301 in Manatee County south to River Road near Venice opened, which would be completed south to the southern segment in Punta Gorda later that year. It would reach Alligator Alley in Naples by 1984. The route from Tampa to Naples would be complete by 1986 as segments of the Tampa bypass were opened from 1982 to 1986. In the Miami area, I-75 was opened from US 27 to its terminus at the Palmetto Expressway in 1986.

Alligator Alley

The Alligator Alley segment of I-75 extends from a toll plaza just east of Naples to an interchange with I-595 and the Sawgrass Expressway (SR 869) in Sunrise just west of Fort Lauderdale. The highway previously existed as a two-lane tollway connecting the two coasts of Florida. Initially known as the Everglades Parkway (SR 84), it opened for traffic on February 11, 1968, after four years of construction. Built by H. L. Mills Construction Company, it had been called the most controversial roadway ever built in Florida during its initial construction. The name "Alligator Alley" was given by the American Automobile Association (AAA) while it was being planned as they believed it would be useless to cars and merely an "alley for alligators". However, as alligators often frequent the waterways beside the road, and occasionally the roadway itself, the nickname has developed a somewhat literal meaning. The state moved to officially adopt the "Alligator Alley" name in 1966.

As a two-lane road, Alligator Alley suffered from poor construction and environmental planning. It was also notorious for high-speed accidents including both head-on collisions and collisions with wildlife. The need to improve the road was one of the factors considered in the decision to reroute I-75 onto Alligator Alley, which was rebuilt as a four-lane Interstate Highway between 1986 and 1992. Many bridges and culverts designed to let water and wildlife pass underneath the roadway and permit the natural flow of the Everglades' waters were built as part of the upgrade. This helped to reduce the environmental impact of the highway somewhat, especially upon the severely endangered Florida panther. The completion of the converted Alligator Alley was the final link of the I-75 extension. The segment was signed I-75 on November 25, 1992, completing the highway from Miami to Sault Ste. Marie, Michigan.

The highway is well known for its predominantly flat character and the extraordinarily linear path the highway follows. In January 2000, the west end toll plaza of Alligator Alley was dedicated to the memory of Edward J. Beck, a toll collector who was murdered on the job on January 30, 1974.

In April 2008, FDOT proposed a  section of Alligator Alley to be leased to private operators. The additional revenue the state would receive was one of primary motives to privatize this section of Alligator Alley. However, the motion failed in May 2009 when no bids were received that met the required terms.

Recent history
FDOT contracted Prince Contracting in 2015 to construct the state's first diverging diamond interchange (DDI) at the University Parkway (exit 213) interchange. The $74.5-million (equivalent to $ in ) project started construction in August 2015 and completed in September 2017. The interchange handles more than 80,000 vehicles per day and reduced intersection delays by 50 percent.

FDOT implemented express lanes along  of the I-75 and SR 826 (Palmetto Expressway) corridors, from just south of the SR 836 (Dolphin Expressway), in Miami-Dade County, to I-595 in Broward County. The project completed another section of the South Florida managed lanes network for all motorists and improves mobility, relieves congestion, provides additional travel options, and accommodates future growth in the area. The 75 Express Lanes project extends  along I-75 from Northwest 170th Street, in Miami-Dade County, to I-595, in Broward County. Work was completed in four segments to minimize the effects on the public. Construction began in early 2014 and was completed in 2018. The total project cost $481 million (equivalent to $ in ).

In 2015, the Central Florida Expressway Authority (CFX), FDOT, and FTE announced a $68.5-million (equivalent to $ in ) project to make several improvements to I-75's interchange with SR 44 (exit 329) and the adjoining interchange with Florida's Turnpike (exit 328). This included adding a collector–distributor ramp in each direction along I-75 leading to the interchange northbound, and leading from SR 44 to the southbound Turnpike, as well as widening I-75 to six lanes in each direction leading to the interchange, and adding another access point from the northbound Turnpike to SR 44 (exit 307). The project, which was handled by Middlesex Construction, began construction in September 2016. The new northbound offramp to SR 44 was completed on September 19, 2019, and the new southbound onramps to the Turnpike and I-75 were completed in early November 2019. The project overall was completed in January 2020.

An additional interchange was planned for Overpass Road north of SR 54, connecting to County Road 530. The interchange opened to traffic the morning of January 18, 2023.

Another DDI with SR 56 (exit 275) was initially proposed in May 2018; construction on the revamped intersection began in February 2019, and it was completed in 2022.

Services
Several rest area facilities exist along I-75 throughout the state. In addition, there are separate facilities for each direction of the Interstate in Hamilton and Suwannee counties, southbound and northbound, respectively, and a welcome center south of the state line. Exit 131 has a single facility accessible from both travel directions on I-75, as well as the intersecting highway. Exit 161 had a rest stop at the interchange's southeast quadrant, but it closed in 2015 because of low usage. Exit 191 also had a rest stop at the interchange's northeast quadrant that closed in the 1990s. Each rest area has restrooms, vending machines, picnic tables, dog walk areas, and nighttime security. The welcome center also has travel information and free orange juice, the state's official state beverage.

Motorist-aid call boxes were installed starting in 1973, initially from the Georgia line to Lake City, eventually being installed on both outside shoulders of the road every  to allow drivers to indicate the need for gasoline, repair (tire or engine), or emergency services (police, ambulance, or fire). The majority of the call boxes were removed in late 2013 because of the rising maintenance cost and the availability of newer technology.

Intelligent transportation systems (ITS) are used throughout the Interstate. ITS is a fiber optic system of traffic cameras, overhead message signs, microwave vehicle detectors, travel time sensors, road and weather information sensors, and highway advisory radios. FDOT has a data-share agreement with Waze which provides real-time information for the state's 5-1-1 service, ITS, and to Waze users.

Exit list
FDOT transitioned existing interchange exit numbers on all Interstate Highways from sequential exits to mileage-based exits in January 2002.

Express lanes

In literature
In John D. MacDonald's novel, The Long Lavender Look, part of his series about fictional detective Travis McGee, the story takes place on Alligator Alley and in nearby towns accessible from it.

References

External links

 Interstate 75 Index: Florida at AARoads
 I-275 Florida has information tangential to its parent I-75 in the Tampa Bay area

75
 Florida
Expressways in Florida
Expressways in Miami-Dade County, Florida
Expressways in Broward County, Florida
Roads in Collier County, Florida
Roads in Lee County, Florida
Roads in Charlotte County, Florida
Roads in DeSoto County, Florida
Roads in Sarasota County, Florida
Roads in Manatee County, Florida
Expressways in Hillsborough County, Florida
Expressways in the Tampa Bay area
Roads in Sumter County, Florida
Roads in Marion County, Florida
Roads in Alachua County, Florida
Roads in Gainesville, Florida
Roads in Columbia County, Florida
Roads in Suwannee County, Florida
Roads in Hamilton County, Florida
Transportation in Miami-Dade County, Florida
Transportation in Broward County, Florida
Transportation in Collier County, Florida
Transportation in Lee County, Florida
Transportation in Charlotte County, Florida
Transportation in DeSoto County, Florida
Transportation in Sarasota County, Florida
Transportation in Manatee County, Florida
Transportation in Hillsborough County, Florida
Transportation in Sumter County, Florida
Transportation in Marion County, Florida
Transportation in Alachua County, Florida
Transportation in Columbia County, Florida
Transportation in Suwannee County, Florida
Transportation in Hamilton County, Florida